Governor Ramsay may refer to:

Andrew Ramsay (governor), Governor of Bombay in 1788
Simon Ramsay, 16th Earl of Dalhousie (1914–1999), Governor-General of the Federation of Rhodesia and Nyasaland from 1957 to 1963
George Ramsay, 9th Earl of Dalhousie (1770–1838), Governor of Nova Scotia from 1816 to 1820 and Governor General of British North America from 1820 to 1828